Manuel Gómez-Moreno González (26 June 1834 – 20 December 1918) was a Spanish painter, amateur archaeologist and professor. His son was the noted historian and archaeologist, Manuel Gómez-Moreno Martínez.

Biography 
He was born to a liberal family in Granada and was descended from "afrancesados". His father, owned a book store that carried out typography and book-binding. 
 
Upon discovering that he had a talent for art, he was enrolled at the "Escuela de Bellas Artes" and, seeing how quickly he learned, he was transferred to the Academia de Bellas Artes de San Fernando in Madrid, where he studied from 1857 to 1860 with Federico de Madrazo, Antonio María Esquivel and Juan Antonio Ribera.

Following his return to Granada, he found himself in economic difficulties. This was eased somewhat after winning prizes in 1861 and 1862 at events related to Corpus Christi festivities, organized by the city government of Granada, which resulted in several  commissions.

In 1867, he obtained a position as a professor of drawing at the "Colegio de San Bartolomé y Santiago". He also taught classes at the "Escuela de Artes y Oficios del Asilo de San José" and, until 1888, he held the chair of decorative composition at the "Escuela de Bellas Artes". In the evenings, he gave private lessons for free.

Meanwhile, he continued to paint prolifically; creating scenes from the life of the bourgeoisie and Spanish history; winning a gold medal at the Exposición Granadina in 1876. Two years later, the provincial government awarded him a stipend to study in Rome, where he lived until 1880 with his wife and son. One of the works he painted there ("St.John of God saving the Sick from a Fire at the Royal Hospital") won second prize at the National Exhibition of Fine Arts in 1881.

Since he was a young boy, he was also interested in investigating the history of Granada.

In 1892, he began publishing the Guía de Granada, which has served as a model for subsequent guide books. He also published numerous historical studies in pamphlets and magazines; notably on Diego de Siloé, the Palace of Charles V, Alonso Cano, the paintings of the Alhambra and several monuments (he was a member of the Monument Commission).

His works and his advice were influential during the creation of the Archaeological Museum of Granada. In 1904, he was elected President of the "Patronato de la Alhambra y el Generalife", an organization devoted to historical preservation. He also served as President of the Royal Chapel of Granada. He died in Granada, aged 84.

Selected paintings

Publications
 Obra dispersa e inédita; compilación y estudio preliminar de Javier Moya Morales, Granada: Editorial Instituto Gómez-Moreno de la Fundación Rodríguez Acosta, 2004.
 Guía de Granada, 1892.
 Cosas granadinas de arte y arqueología, Granada [1916]
 Palacio del Emperador Carlos V en la Alhambra, Madrid: [s. n.], 1885
 Medina Elvira, Granada: Imp. La Lealtad, 1888; hay ed. moderna con estudio preliminar y cuidado de la edición por Manuel Barrios Aguilera, Granada: Grupo de Autores Unidos, 1986.
 Breves noticias sobre las moradas de algunos hombres ilustres en las ciencias, en las letras y en las artes, que han vivido en Granada, Granada: Paulino Ventura y Sabatel, 1870.
 Iglesias mozárabes: Arte español de los siglos IX a XI, Madrid: Centro de estudios históricos, 1919.
 Pinturas del Tocador de la Reina en la Casa Real de la Alhambra: apuntes, Granada. Imp. Indalecio Ventura, 1873
 Breve reseña de los monumentos y obras de arte que ha perdido Granada en lo que va de siglo,Granada: Imprenta de D. José López Guevara, 1884.
 Las pinturas de la Alhambra, 
 Estudio sobre las sepulturas granadinas,
 Carácter de los monumentos granadinos

References

Further reading 
Javier Moya Morales, Manuel Gómez-Moreno González. Pintor, Diputación de Granada, Departamento de publicaciones, 2015  
Emilio Robles Garcia, Manuel Gómez-Moreno González: pintor de Historia, Adhara, 1997

External links 

"Manuel Gómez-Moreno González: El Hombre que lo Dio Todo por Granada" by Carolina Molina.

1834 births
1918 deaths
19th-century Spanish painters
19th-century Spanish male artists
Spanish male painters
20th-century Spanish painters
20th-century Spanish male artists
History painters
Orientalist painters
People from Granada
Real Academia de Bellas Artes de San Fernando alumni
19th-century Spanish archaeologists
Spanish genre painters